Norberto Salandanan Amoranto (1907–1979) was a Filipino politician who served as Mayor of Quezon City from 1954 to 1976.

Career
Norberto S. Amoranto became Mayor of Quezon City when he was appointed to the position by President Ramon Magsaysay on January 11, 1954. He contested in the first ever Quezon City elections on November 10, 1959, where he became the first elected mayor of the city.

The current 15-storey Quezon City Hall building was built under Amoranto's term from 1964 to 1972. The structure was one of the most expensive city halls in the country.

Under Amoranto, the University of the Philippines Diliman, was allowed to maintain security of its campus without interference from the city police. This setup remained until, the national government's Peace and Order Council decided to forcibly intervene during the 1971 Diliman Commune uprising.

Amoranto resigned as mayor on March 30, 1976. He was replaced by Adelina Santos-Rodriguez, whom President then dictator Ferdinand Marcos appointed as his successor.

Death
Amoranto died on December 22, 1979.

Legacy
Amoranto is noted for being the longest serving Mayor of Quezon City at 22 years spanning four presidencies (of Ramon Magsaysay, Carlos P. Garcia, Diosdado Macapagal, and Ferdinand Marcos). Several places in Quezon City were named after him such as barangay N.S. Amoranto (formerly known as Gintong Silahis until 1984), N.S. Amoranto Sr. Street (formerly called Retiro), and the Amoranto Sports Complex.

References

Mayors of Quezon City
1907 births
1979 deaths